The 1969 Paddington North by-election was a by-election to the British House of Commons for the constituency of Paddington North. It was necessitated by the death of sitting MP Ben Parkin.

Parkin had been on the left of the party and was part of a delegation of Labour MPs who met Joseph Stalin in 1947; when he voted against the Ireland Bill, he was warned by the Chief Whip about his conduct.

The result was a hold for the Labour Party.

Previous election

References

1969 elections in the United Kingdom
1969 in London
October 1969 events in the United Kingdom
By-elections to the Parliament of the United Kingdom in London constituencies
Elections in the City of Westminster
Paddington